Anthony Toby Hiller (30 July 1927 – 26 August 2018) was an English songwriter and record producer. He was best known for writing and/or producing hits for Brotherhood of Man, including "United We Stand" (1970) and "Save Your Kisses for Me" (1976).

Biography
The eldest of eight children, he was born in Bethnal Green, East London, England. Along with other staff and students from his Jewish Free School in Kenton, London, he was evacuated to Ely, Cambridgeshire, in 1939. He began his musical career as a member of the song and dance duo The Hiller Brothers, sharing the stage with his brother Irving. The Hiller Brothers appeared with many performers of the time including Alma Cogan, Tommy Cooper, Val Doonican, Matt Monro, The Shadows, Bernard Manning, Kathy Kirby, Roger Whittaker, Rip Taylor, Gene Vincent, Lance Percival, Tessie O'Shea, Frank Ifield, Deep River Boys, The Dallas Boys, Clark Brothers, Paul Melba, and Ray Burns.

Hiller was best known for writing and/or producing numerous hits for Brotherhood of Man, including "United We Stand" (1970), "Save Your Kisses for Me" (1976), "Angelo" (1977), and "Figaro" (1978). The song "United We Stand" is considered a worldwide standard and has been recorded by over 100 different artists. Thirty years after the original hit, the song was popularized again by becoming a patriotic and spiritual anthem, and was recorded by several more artists. It was used numerous times in the production of various network news broadcasts during coverage of the 9/11 events.

Hiller also wrote "Caroline" recorded by The Fortunes on Decca Records in 1964 which became famous as the theme tune for the North Sea pirate station Radio Caroline and is still used as the station theme today.

Over 500 other artists have recorded Hiller's songs including Elton John, Olivia Newton-John, Andy Williams, Ray Stevens, The Miracles, The Hollies, Sonny and Cher, The Osmonds, Glen Campbell, Crystal Gayle, Anne Murray, and Ed Bruce. He won three Ivor Novello Awards and a Gold Badge Award for his services to the British music industry.

Chart hits

Awards and achievements
 Three Ivor Novello Awards (UK)
 Ivor Novello Nomination, International Hit of the Year (UK)
 British Academy of Songwriters, Composers and Authors, Councillor (UK)
 British Academy of Composers and Songwriters, Gold Badge of Merit (UK)
 Six ASCAP Awards (US)
 Two ASCAP Chart Buster Awards (US)
 Eurovision Song Contest winner
 Top selling single of 1976 (UK)
 Yamaha Song Contest, Outstanding Composition
 Performing Right Society (now PRS for Music), Director
 Recipient of over 40 Silver, Gold and Platinum Discs
 Society of Distinguished Songwriters

References

External links

Discography
Discography (2)

1927 births
2018 deaths
English songwriters
English country music songwriters
English record producers
Ivor Novello Award winners
Eurovision Song Contest winners
People from Bethnal Green
Singers from London